Erzincan, historically Yerznka, is the capital of Erzincan Province in eastern Turkey. Nearby cities include Erzurum, Sivas, Tunceli, Bingöl, Elazığ, Malatya, Gümüşhane, Bayburt, and Giresun. The city is majority Sunni Turkish with a significant Alevi Kurdish minority.

The city had a population of 150,714 in 2022, an increase from 86,779 in 2007.

Neighborhoods 
It is divided into the neighborhoods of Akşemsettin, Aktoprak, Akyazı, Aslancak, Arslanlı, Atatürk, Aziz Baba, Bahçelievler, Barbaros, Barış, Başbağlar, Başpınar, Bayrak, Bozyazı, Buğdaylı, Bulutlu, Büyük Çakırman, Cemal Gürsel, Cumhuriyet, Çarşı, Çukurkuyu, Davarlı, Demetevler, Demirkent, Dereyurt, Ergenekon, Ersevenler, Ertuğrul Gazi, Esentepe, Fatih, Gazi, Gölcük, Gülalibey, Güllüce, H.Ahmet Yesevi, Halitpaşa, Hamidiye, Hancı, Hocabey, Hürrempalangası, Işıkpınar, İnönu, İzzetpaşa, Karaağaç, Kavakyolu, Kazımkarabekir, Keklikkayası, Kızılay, Kurutilek, Menderes, Mengüceli, Mimarsinan, Munzur, Mustafa Kemal Paşa, Osman Gazi, Osmanlı, Özgürlük, Paşa, Sancak, Sarıgöl, Selçuklu, Şehit Cengiz Topel, Şehit Serhat, Şehit Serhat Yurtbaşı, Taksim, Terzibaba, Ulalar, Üçkonak, Yalnızbağ, Yavuzselim, Yeni, Yenidoğan and Yunusemre.

History
Acilisene, the ancient region that is now Erzincan, was the site of the Peace of Acilisene by which in AD 387 Armenia was divided into two vassal states, a smaller one dependent on the Byzantine Empire and a larger one dependent on Persia. This is the name (Ἀκιλισηνή in Greek) by which it is called by Strabo in his Geography, 11.4.14. The etymological origin of the word is disputed, but it is agreed that the city was once called Erez. For a while it was called Justinianopolis in honour of Emperor Justinian. In more recent Greek it has been called as Κελτζηνή (Keltzene) and Κελεζηνή (Kelezene).

In the Armenian language, the 5th-century Life of Mashtots called it Yekeghiats. In the more recent past, it was known in Armenian as Երզնկա (Yerznka).

In the settlement of Erez, at a yet unidentified site, there was a pre-Christian shrine dedicated to the Armenian goddess Anahit. A text of Agathangelos reports that during the first year of his reign, King Trdat of Armenia went to Erez and visited Anahit's temple to offer sacrifice. He ordered Gregory the Illuminator, who was secretly a Christian, to make an offering at its altar. When Gregory refused, he was taken captive and tortured, starting the events that would end with Trdat's conversion to Christianity some 14 years later. After that conversion, during the Christianisation of Armenia, the temple at Erez was destroyed and its property and lands were given to Gregory. It later became known for its extensive monasteries.

It is hard to tell when Acilisene became a bishopric. The first whose name is known is of the mid-5th century: Ioannes, who in 459 signed the decree of Patriarch Gennadius I of Constantinople against the simoniacs. Georgius or Gregorius (both forms are found) was one of the Fathers of the Second Council of Constantinople (553), appearing as "bishop of Justinianopolis". Theodorus was at the Third Council of Constantinople in 681, signing as "bishop of Justinianopolis or the region of Ecclenzine". Georgius was at the Photian Council of Constantinople (879). Until the 10th century, the diocese itself appears in none of the Notitiae Episcopatuum. At the end of that century, they present it as an autocephalous archdiocese, and those of the 11th century present it as a metropolitan see with 21 suffragans. This was the time of greatest splendour of Acilisene, which ended with the decisive defeat of the Byzantines by the Seljuk Turks at the Battle of Manzikert in 1071. After the 13th century, there is no mention of diocesan bishops of Acilisene and the see no longer appears in Notitiae Episcopatuum. No longer a residential bishopric, Acilisene is today listed by the Catholic Church as a titular see.

In 1071 Erzincan was absorbed into the Mengüçoğlu under the Seljuk Sulëiman Kutalmish. Marco Polo, who wrote about his visit to Erzincan, said that the "people of the country are Armenians" and that Erzincan was the "noblest of cities" which contained the See of an Archbishop. In 1243 it was destroyed in fighting between the Seljuks under Kaykhusraw II and the Mongols. However, by 1254 its population had recovered enough that William of Rubruck was able to say an earthquake had killed more than 10,000 people. During this period, the city reached a level of semi-independence under the rule of Armenian princes.

Erzincan was one of the most pivotal towns in Safavid history. It was there, in the summer of 1500, that about 7,000 Qizilbash forces, consisting of the Ustaclu, Shamlu, Rumlu, Tekelu, Zhulkadir, Afshar, Qajar and Varsak tribes, responded to the invitation of Ismail I, who would aid in him establishing his dynasty.

Armenian genocide 
According to the 1914 Ottoman census, which undercounted religious minority groups such as Armenians, there were 16.144 Armenian Gregorians and 147 Protestants in the central kaza. In the other kazas of Erzincan there were 11.135 Armenian Gregorians and 144 Protestants in Kemah. However, Miller and Kévorkian's research state that the Armenians in the centre of Erzincan were more than double the census data. Of the pre-World War I population of 37,000 Armenians in Erzincan and suburbs, most were killed in the genocide.

During the Armenian genocide, at least 150,000 Armenian men, women and children from Erzincan and surrounding areas were transported by Turkish forces between 1915 and 1916 through Erzincan proper, where a series of transit camps were set up to control the flow of victims to the concentration camp and killing site at the nearby Kemah gorge. J.M. Winter's work state that between 1915 and 1917, the Central Hospital of Erzincan was the primary site of medical experiments conducted by Turkish army physicians on Armenian civilians involving typhus and other lethal infectious agents. As of 2019, few traces of Armenian presence or civilization remain in Erzincan.

Battle of Erzincan

The Battle of Erzincan took place during the Caucasus Campaign of the First World War. In 1916 Erzincan was the headquarters for the Turkish Third Army commanded by Abdul Kerim Pasha. The Russian General Nikolai Yudenich led the Russian Caucasus Army who captured Mama Hatun on 12 July 1916. They then gained the heights of Naglika and took a Turkish position on the banks of the Durum Durasi river, with their cavalry breaking through the Boz-Tapa-Meretkli line. They then advanced on Erzincan arriving by 25 July and taking the city in two days. The city was relatively untouched by battle and Yudenich seized large quantities of supplies. Despite the strategic advantages gained from this victory, Yudenich made no more significant advances and his forces were reduced due to Russian reverses further north.

Erzincan Soviet 
A short-lived soviet council had been at Erzincan between 1916 and 1918. Mainly today's Erzincan and Tunceli provinces were under Russian occupation. After the revolution, Bolshevik soldiers took control of the officer corps. Arshak Djamalian who was a Bolshevik soldier, called Kurdish, Turkish, and Armenian representatives to take charge of the administration of Erzincan Soviet.

Turkish capture of Erzincan 
Following the withdrawal of the Russian Army, the commander of the First Caucasian Army Corps Kâzım Karabekir regained control over Erzincan on the 13 February 1918. This event is celebrated annually by its inhabitants.

1939 Erzincan earthquake

The city was completely destroyed by a major earthquake on December 27, 1939. The sequence of seven violent shocks, the biggest measuring 7.8 on the moment magnitude scale, was the joint most-powerful earthquake recorded in Turkey, tied with the 2023 Turkey–Syria earthquake. The first stage of the earthquake killed about 8,000 people. The next day, it was reported that the death toll had risen to 20,000. An emergency relief operation began. By the end of the year, 32,962 had died due to more earthquakes and several floods. So extensive was the damage to Erzincan city that its old site was entirely abandoned, and a new town was founded a little further to the north. Certain local folklore attributed the earthquake to "Armenians’ curse taking effect," referring to local victims of the Armenian genocide.

Climate
Erzincan has a continental climate (Köppen climate classification: Dsa or Trewartha climate classification: Dca) with cold, snowy winters and hot, dry summers. Spring is the wettest season whilst summer is the driest. The lowest temperature recorded was −32.5 °C (−26.5 °F) in January 1950. The highest temperature recorded was 40.6 °C (105.1 °F) in July 2000. The highest snow thickness recorded was 74 cm (29.1 inches) in February 1950.

Economy

Mulberry tree plantations were found in Erzincan in the early 20th century, which were used in sericulture.

Notable people

 Hovhannes Erznkatsi Blouz (1230?–1293), Armenian scholar, poet, philosopher, orator
 Sibel Arslan (born 1980), Swiss-Turkish politician femme lawyer of Kurdish origin
 Kutluğ Ataman, Turkish filmmaker and contemporary artist
 Ahmet Bozkurt, poet and writer 
 Ali Ekber Çiçek, folk musician, was born in 1935 in Erzincan.
 Mustafa Sarıgül, politician, was born in Erzincan.
 Varaztad Kazanjian, Armenian-American dentist who was one of the pioneers of plastic surgery
 Soghomon Tehlirian, Armenian revolutionary
 Voskan Martikian, Armenian politician and writer
 Yıldırım Akbulut, former prime minister of Turkey 
 Osman Nuri Koptagel, military officer in the Ottoman and Turkish armies
 Vecdi Gönül, Turkish cabinet minister

References

External links

 Governor's Office
 Municipality

 
Erzincan
Districts of Erzincan Province
Cities destroyed by earthquakes